Chợ Lớn, usually anglicized as "Cholon" in English sources, is a quarter of Ho Chi Minh City, Vietnam. It lies on the west bank of the Saigon River, having Bình Tây Market as its central market. Chợ Lớn consists of the western half of District 5 as well as several adjoining neighborhoods in District 6 and  District 11. The quarter has long been inhabited by Chinese people, and is considered the largest Chinatown in the world by area.

The Vietnamese name Chợ Lớn literally means "big" (lớn) "market" (chợ). The Chinese (and original) name is 堤岸 (In Cantonese, tai4ngon6, which is occasionally rendered in Vietnamese orthography as Thầy Ngòn or Thì Ngòn, and in Mandarin, Dī'àn), which means "embankment" (French: quais). The Sino-Vietnamese reading of the Chinese name is Đê Ngạn, but this is rarely used. Vietnamese speakers exclusively use the name Chợ Lớn, while Chinese speakers (both inside Vietnam and in China) are the only users of the original Chinese name.

History
 
The city of Chợ Lớn was established by the Hoa community. The Lê dynasty which was the ruling family in the sixteenth century began to decline in power and two rival families, the Trịnh and Nguyễn families began to vie for power to fill in the void of the Lê. The Nguyễn lords was then appointed as Viceroy of the South with headquarters at Huế where they encouraged Chinese immigration to settle down into the area.

In 1778, Hoa people living in Biên Hòa had to take refuge in what is now Chợ Lớn because they were retaliated against by the Tây Sơn forces for their support of the Nguyễn lords. In 1782, more than 10,000 Hoa people were again massacred by the Tây Sơn and had to rebuild. They built high embankments against the flows of the river, and called their new settlement Tai-Ngon (meaning "embankment" in Cantonese).

Chợ Lớn was incorporated as a city in 1879,   from Saigon. By the 1930s, it had expanded to the city limit of Saigon. On April 27, 1931, Chợ Lớn and the neighboring city of Saigon were merged to form a single city called Saigon–Cholon. The official name, however, never entered everyday vernacular and the city continued to be referred to as Saigon. "Cholon" was dropped from the city's official name in 1956, after Vietnam gained independence from France in 1955.

During the Vietnam War, soldiers and deserters from the United States Army maintained a thriving black market at Chợ Lớn, trading in various American and especially U.S. Army-issue items. This was the area, near the Quan Âm Pagoda where photojournalist Eddie Adams took his famous execution photograph. Four Australian journalists were also killed in Chợ Lớn during the Tet Offensive in 1968.

Today, Chợ Lớn attracts many tourists, especially mainland Chinese and Taiwanese.

Notable residents
Yvon Petra - He was born in Chợ Lớn. He is best remembered as the last Frenchman to win the Wimbledon championships men's singles title in 1946.
Cao Văn Viên - Chief of the Joint General Staff of the Army of the Republic of Vietnam from 1966 to 1975.
Gontran de Poncins - French author, aristocrat and adventurer lived here in 1955. He resided in the Sun Wah hotel, keeping an illustrated journal which was published as From a Chinese City (published in 1957). "He chose Cholon, the Chinese riverbank community snuggled up to Saigon, because he suspected the ancient customs of a national culture endure longer in remote colonies than in the motherland. In effect, he was studying a bit of ancient China."
Charles Tran Van Lam
Wan Kwong (Chinese: 尹光), born Lui Minkwong (呂明光 and also known as Jackson Wan Kwong), Hong Kong singer

Temples and Monuments

Quan Âm Pagoda, Ho Chi Minh City (觀音寺) 
Thiên Hậu Temple, Ho Chi Minh City
Cho Lon Mosque 
Nhị Phủ Temple (二府廟) 
Hà Chương (Hokkien) Guildhall 
Miếu Quan Đế (關帝廟) 
Minh Hương Guildhall (明鄉嘉盛會館)
Tam Sơn Guildhall (三山會館)

External links

literatier Ulrich Brinkhoff: Albträume am Saigon-Fluss. Agenda 2014, .
book contains many situations and photos in Cholon (in German)

References

Chinatowns in Asia
Chinese diaspora in Vietnam
Populated places in Ho Chi Minh City
Tourist attractions in Ho Chi Minh City